Oleksandr Yatsenko (born 5 August 1979) is a Ukrainian boxer. He competed in the men's heavyweight event at the 2000 Summer Olympics.

References

1979 births
Living people
Ukrainian male boxers
Olympic boxers of Ukraine
Boxers at the 2000 Summer Olympics
Place of birth missing (living people)
Heavyweight boxers